Jefferson Township is the name of 18 townships in the U.S. state of Missouri:

Jefferson Township, Andrew County, Missouri
 Jefferson Township, Cedar County, Missouri
 Jefferson Township, Clark County, Missouri
 Jefferson Township, Cole County, Missouri
 Jefferson Township, Daviess County, Missouri
 Jefferson Township, Grundy County, Missouri
 Jefferson Township, Harrison County, Missouri
 Jefferson Township, Johnson County, Missouri
 Jefferson Township, Linn County, Missouri
 Jefferson Township, Maries County, Missouri
 Jefferson Township, Monroe County, Missouri
 Jefferson Township, Nodaway County, Missouri
 Jefferson Township, Osage County, Missouri
 Jefferson Township, Polk County, Missouri
 Jefferson Township, Scotland County, Missouri
 Jefferson Township, Shelby County, Missouri
 Jefferson Township, St. Louis County, Missouri
 Jefferson Township, Wayne County, Missouri

See also 
 Jefferson Township (disambiguation)

Missouri township disambiguation pages